Osman de Menezes Venâncio Júnior (born 29 October 1992), known as Osman Júnior or simply Osman, is a Brazilian footballer who plays for Cuiabá. Mainly a winger, he can also play as an attacking midfielder.

Club career

Early career
Osman Júnior was born in São Paulo, and was a Santos youth graduate. Released in 2012, he signed for Oeste and made his senior debut on 12 August of that year by coming on as a second-half substitute in a 0–1 Série C away loss against Chapecoense.

After being rarely used, Osman Júnior represented Comercial-SP, Sertãozinho and Juventus in quick succession.

Luverdense
On 10 January 2015, Osman Júnior joined Luverdense. He scored his first goal for the club on 10 March, netting the opener in a 2–0 home success over Operário Várzea-Grandense.

Osman Júnior scored his first professional goal on 16 May 2015, netting the game's only in a home success over América Mineiro for the Série B championship. He finished the campaign with four goals in 35 appearances, as his side achieved a mid-table position.

Loan to América Mineiro
On 28 December 2015 Osman Júnior was loaned to América Mineiro, recently promoted to Série A, for one year. He made his debut in the competition on 15 May 2016, playing the full 90 minutes in a 0–1 home loss against Fluminense.

Loan to Chapecoense
On 9 January 2017, Osman Júnior was presented at Chapecoense also in the top tier, after agreeing to a one-year loan deal. In June, he suffered a serious knee injury, being sidelined for the remainder of the campaign; his loan was renewed for a further year the following 8 January.

Red Bull (Brasil & Bragantino)
On 7 January 2019, Osman Júnior signed a short-term deal with Red Bull Brasil, for the Campeonato Paulista. He became a Red Bull Bragantino player when Red Bull Brasil merged with Clube Atlético Bragantino in April 2019.

Career statistics

Honours
Oeste
Campeonato Brasileiro Série C: 2012

América Mineiro
Campeonato Mineiro: 2016

Chapecoense
Campeonato Catarinense: 2017

References

External links

1992 births
Living people
Footballers from São Paulo
Brazilian footballers
Association football midfielders
Association football forwards
Campeonato Brasileiro Série A players
Campeonato Brasileiro Série B players
Campeonato Brasileiro Série C players
K League 1 players
Oeste Futebol Clube players
Comercial Futebol Clube (Ribeirão Preto) players
Sertãozinho Futebol Clube players
Clube Atlético Juventus players
Luverdense Esporte Clube players
América Futebol Clube (MG) players
Associação Chapecoense de Futebol players
Red Bull Brasil players
Red Bull Bragantino players
Gyeongnam FC players
Associação Atlética Ponte Preta players
Coritiba Foot Ball Club players
Cuiabá Esporte Clube players
Brazilian expatriate footballers
Brazilian expatriate sportspeople in South Korea
Expatriate footballers in South Korea